Jackson Township is one of the fifteen townships of Ashland County, Ohio, United States. The 2010 census found 3,887 people in the township, 3,551 of whom lived in the unincorporated portions of the township.

Geography
Located in the northeastern part of the county, it borders the following townships:
Homer Township, Medina County - northeast
Congress Township, Wayne County - east
Chester Township, Wayne County - southeast corner
Perry Township - south
Montgomery Township - southwest
Orange Township - west
Sullivan Township - northwest

The village of Polk is located in western Jackson Township, and the census-designated place of Cinnamon Lake, built around a reservoir of the same name, lies in the township's north.

Name and history
Jackson Township was organized in 1819.

It is one of thirty-seven Jackson Townships statewide.

Government
The township is governed by a three-member board of trustees, who are elected in November of odd-numbered years to a four-year term beginning on the following January 1. Two are elected in the year after the presidential election and one is elected in the year before it. There is also an elected township fiscal officer, who serves a four-year term beginning on April 1 of the year after the election, which is held in November of the year before the presidential election. Vacancies in the fiscal officership or on the board of trustees are filled by the remaining trustees.

References

External links
Township website
County website

Townships in Ashland County, Ohio
1819 establishments in Ohio
Populated places established in 1819
Townships in Ohio